Algharabolli National Park, also Karabolli National Park, is a national park of Libya close to Tripoli, and right next to Al-Garabulli.

Flora and fauna
The park houses freshwater streams from springs as well as coastal areas on the mediterranean sea. It's well known for beautiful beaches, sand dunes and the sheer cliffs. The designated bird sanctuary hosts over 1000 species of birds, hyenas and seals.

External links
 the worlds national parks
 Worldatlas
 Protected Planet

References

National parks of Libya
Protected areas established in 1992